The Ateliers de construction d'Issy-les-Moulineaux (English translation: construction workshops of Issy-les-Moulineaux) were born from the nationalization of the Renault factories in Issy-les-Moulineaux in 1936. They were specialized in the construction of armored vehicles for the French Army. The workshops were also known by the acronym AMX where A stands for Ateliers and MX stands for Moulineaux. Armored vehicles designed by Ateliers de construction d'Issy-les-Moulineaux had the acronym AMX in front of the name such as AMX-13, AMX-30.

Models studied and products 

The models below were not all mass-produced at the AMX. After its separation from Renault, AMX was mostly dedicated to the design and realization of prototype tanks and the production of vehicles specific in small series.
It was moved to Satory plateau where it was merged with Atelier de Construction de Puteaux (APX).

Models designed but not mass-produced:

 AMX-32
 AMX 38 (prototype)
 AMX 40
 AMX-50
 AMX ELC(Engin Léger de Combat)

Models designed and mass produced:

 AMX-13 and its variants and derivatives (75 mm, 90 mm, AMX-13 VCI, etc.)
 AMX-10P
 AMX-10 RC
 AMX-30
 AMX-30E
 AMX AuF1

This company also fabricated Puteaux SA 18 cannons.

Motor vehicle assembly plants in France
Weapons manufacturing companies
Defence companies of France
Manufacturing companies based in Paris